Kaczyce may refer to the following places in Poland:
Kaczyce, Silesian Voivodeship (south Poland)
Kaczyce, Lower Silesian Voivodeship (south-west Poland)
Kaczyce, Świętokrzyskie Voivodeship (south-central Poland)